The 2006 United States Grand Prix (formally the 2006 Formula 1 United States Grand Prix) was a Formula One motor race held at the Indianapolis Motor Speedway in Speedway, Indiana on 2 July 2006. It was the tenth race of the 2006 Formula One season and the 40th United States Grand Prix. The 73-lap race was won by Ferrari driver Michael Schumacher after starting from pole position. Teammate Felipe Massa finished second with Renault driver Giancarlo Fisichella third.

As a consequence of the race, Michael Schumacher scored his third win of the season, ending championship rival Fernando Alonso's run of four consecutive wins and reducing the 2005 World Drivers' Champion's lead in the points standings to 19 over the German. Schumacher's Ferrari teammate Felipe Massa made it a Ferrari one-two by finishing in second place as the Maranello-based team also reduced Renault's constructors points advantage to 26.

The race also marked the anniversary of the tire controversy a year earlier, when 14 cars withdrew before the race began because of safety concerns about the supply of Michelin tyres provided to them – which had resulted in crashes during practice. This was also the last race for McLaren driver Juan Pablo Montoya, after he announced that he would be leaving to race in NASCAR in 2007.

This was the last race until the 2015 Malaysian Grand Prix that neither McLaren was classified.

Friday drivers
The bottom 6 teams in the 2005 Constructors' Championship and Super Aguri were entitled to run a third car in free practice on Friday. These drivers drove on Friday but did not compete in qualifying or the race.

Report

Background
The Grand Prix was contested by eleven teams with two drivers each. The teams (also known as Constructors) were Renault, McLaren, Ferrari, Toyota, Williams, Honda, Red Bull, BMW Sauber, MF1, Toro Rosso and Super Aguri.

Going into the race, Renault driver Fernando Alonso led the Drivers' Championship with 84 points, ahead of Michael Schumacher on 59 points and Kimi Räikkönen on 39 points. Giancarlo Fisichella was fourth with 37 points while Felipe Massa was fifth on 28 points. In the Constructors' Championship, Renault were leading with 121 points, Ferrari and McLaren were second and third with 87 and 65 points respectively, while Honda on 29 and BMW Sauber on 19 points contended for fourth place. Renault and Fernando Alonso had so far won the majority of the races, including victory in the preceding Canadian Grand Prix. Championship contenders Schumacher and Fisichella had each gained victories, and Räikkönen, Juan Pablo Montoya had each gained second-place finishes. Massa, Jenson Button, Ralf Schumacher and David Coulthard had achieved third place podium finishes.

Practice and qualifying

Three practice sessions were held before the Sunday race – two on Friday, and one on Saturday. The Friday morning and afternoon sessions each lasted 90 minutes; the third session, on Saturday morning, lasted for an hour.

Saturday afternoon's qualifying session was divided into three parts. The first part ran for 15 minutes, and cars that finished the session 17th position or lower were eliminated from qualifying. The second part of the qualifying session lasted 15 minutes and eliminated cars that finished in positions 11 to 16. The final part of the qualifying session ran for 20 minutes which determined the positions from first to tenth, and decided pole position. Cars which failed to make the final session could refuel before the race, so ran lighter in those sessions.

Michael Schumacher and Felipe Massa earned Ferrari a front row lockout, ahead of Giancarlo Fisichella and Rubens Barrichello. Jarno Trulli's car was still being repaired when cars were sent to parc fermé; because of that, Trulli had to start from the pit lane. Nico Rosberg was penalised for ignoring a signal during the qualification session, requiring him to get his car weighed at the FIA garage. The FIA cancelled all his qualifying times, and he started from 21st position. Toro Rosso's Vitantonio Liuzzi had the engine of his car changed, and had to start from 20th position on the grid.

Race

The race started with two big accidents at the first corner, which eliminated 7 cars. At Turn 1, Mark Webber collided with Christian Klien, who then spun around and was taken out by Franck Montagny. In Turn 2, Juan Pablo Montoya nudged his teammate Kimi Räikkönen into a spin. Montoya then clouted Jenson Button whose front right tyre got caught by BMW Sauber's Nick Heidfeld who was launched into a triple barrel roll; Montoya also clipped Scuderia Toro Rosso's Scott Speed in the incident. None of the drivers were injured. After that, the order stayed the same at the front, the only action being a battle at the back between David Coulthard, Nico Rosberg, and Vitantonio Liuzzi. Rosberg lost out and was the only finishing driver not to score in the race, with Liuzzi gaining Toro Rosso's first ever point. Montoya departed McLaren days after the race, announcing his move to NASCAR for the 2007 season for Chip Ganassi Racing.

Classification

Qualifying

Race

Championship standings after the race

Drivers' Championship standings

Constructors' Championship standings

 Note: Only the top five positions are included for both sets of standings.

References

External links

 Detailed United States Grand Prix results

United States Grand Prix
2006
United States Grand Prix, 2006
2006 in sports in Indiana
United States Grand Prix
July 2006 sports events in the United States